Linwood was an unincorporated village in north-central Daggett County, Utah, United States, near the Wyoming state line. The town, located along Henrys Fork of the Green River, approximately five miles east of the county seat of Manila, was first settled in the 1890s. The nearby bottomland was used for irrigated agriculture, and sheep ranches operated in the more arid lands to the north.

The town of Linwood was in decline by the 1920s, due to farm consolidation and road improvements, which made larger communities more easily accessible to local residents. In the late 1950s, the Linwood area was purchased by the federal government as part of its land acquisition for the Flaming Gorge Reservoir project. The remaining buildings in Linwood were razed or moved, and the townsite is now inundated; no trace of the former community remains.

A United States post office operated at Linwood from 1903 to 1958.

References

External links

1890s establishments in Utah
1950s disestablishments in Utah
Ghost towns in Utah
Submerged settlements in the United States
Ghost towns in Daggett County, Utah
Populated places disestablished in the 1950s
Populated places established in the 1890s